{{Infobox person
|name                 = Mike Goldman
|image                = Mike Goldman (6883587284).jpg
|caption              = Hollywood Celebrities Open Marquee – The Star, Sydney, Australia, 2012
|birth_name           = Michael Goldman
|birth_date           = 
|birth_place          = Gold Coast, Queensland, Australia
|death_date           = 
|death_place          = 
|death_cause          = 
|education            = 
|other_names          = 
|employer             = 
|occupation           = 
|years_active         = 
|spouse               = 
|partner              = 
|parents              = Grant Goldman
|children             = 
|relatives            = 
|website              = 
|known_for            = {{ubl|Big Brother Australia (2001–2008, 2012–2014)|Friday Night Games (2006)|Joker Poker (2006)|Download (2007–2008)}}
}}

Michael Goldman (born 7 November 1972), is an Australian actor, television and radio host and voice over. He has appeared in television roles, mini-series and films like Young Rock, The Wilds and A Place to Call Home. He is the son of television and radio personality Grant Goldman and weather presenter, former miss Australian Beach Girl Erica Hammond.

Career
Television
Recently played an American lawyer in episodes 6 and 7 or Young Rock 2. Now a full time actor and VoiceOver artist, Goldman's first role in television was in a 1991 episode of Home and Away playing a character named Gavin. He then spent three years at Sydney Film and TV Academy.

Since 1997 Goldman has voiced TV commercials for Amart Sports, and later Rebel

In 2001 Goldman became the narrator of Big Brother Australia, as well as other behind-the-scenes roles. From 2003 until 2008 he was the host of Big Brother spin-off UpLate. In 2005 until 2008 he became the host of Big Brother Friday Night Live with former Housemates Bree Amer and Ryan Fitzgerald. This also led to hosting Friday Night Games in 2006 with Amer and Fitzgerald. The trio also presented Download in 2007 and 2008. He remained the narrator of Big Brother until the show was cancelled at the end of the 2008 season.

In 2006 Goldman became the local narrator of Meerkat Manor, dubbing his voiceover in place of that of Bill Nighy in the British show. In 2007, he hosted the second season of Joker Poker alongside poker pro Lee Nelson.

In 2012 Goldman returned to his post as narrator of Big Brother when the show returned on the Nine Network. He also returned in 2013 as commentator of the weekly House games night, now rebranded as Showdown alongside Shelley Craft and former Housemate Michael Beveridge.

In 2019 Goldman appeared in an episode of A Place to Call Home. In 2020 he appeared in single episodes of Wentworth, Monsters of Man and The Wilds. He also presented online Big Brother companion series The Big Bro Show for the Seven News website.

Film
Goldman appeared in 2013 film Goddess starring Ronan Keating and Magda Szubanski and starred as himself in indie film Shooting Goldman in 2014.

Radio & Podcasts
Goldman's first job in radio was for 2SM in Sydney working in the office and helping a blind DJ by putting Braille titles on the CDs and operating the CD player for the overnight shift. When that DJ didn't show up, Goldman was put in charge of the shift instead.

From 1994 until 1998 he hosted the Triple M night show The Rubber Room.

Goldman hosted the summer breakfast radio show on 2Day FM in 2007-08 with Brian McFadden and Ricki-Lee Coulter.

Until January 2010 Goldman was the breakfast host for the Sydney Digital dance radio Gorilla on weekday evenings. He also hosted the drive program for Campbelltown station C91.3.

Mike currently hosts a podcast called On The Mike'' where he interviews a range of different personalities.

Bibliography

Contributor

References

External links

 
 Mike Goldman's blog
 

Australian male comedians
Australian male voice actors
Big Brother (Australian TV series)
Male actors from Sydney
Living people
1972 births
Australian game show hosts